{{Infobox person
| name                      = Mike Trim
| birth_name                = Michael J. Trim
| birth_date                = 
| birth_place               = London, U.K.
| nationality               = British
| occupation                = Designer, model-maker, and storyboard artist
| years_active              = 1964-present
| employer                  = AP Films (1964–1970)
| notable_works             = Thunderbirds Are Go, Captain Scarlet and the Mysterons, Joe 90| television                = Thunderbirds}}
Mike Trim (born 26 August 1945) is an artist famous for illustrating the cover of Jeff Wayne's Musical Version of The War of the Worlds, which depicts a Martian tripod striking down the heroic Thunder Child. A book of his illustrations entitled The Future was FAB: The Art of Mike Trim was released in 2006.

Trim grew up in Fulham, and from an early age started to show artistic talent. He studied at London's Sir Christopher Wren School. At the London School of Printing, he did a two-year course in graphic design.

In 1964, his father saw a newspaper advertisement seeking modelmakers for a film company. Upon hearing this, Trim began an odyssey that would last for more than 40 years. Beginning in the final days of Stingray, he would work as a modelmaker and designer for Gerry and Sylvia Anderson's television series Thunderbirds, Captain Scarlet and the Mysterons, Joe 90, The Secret Service, and UFO, as well as their feature films Thunderbirds Are GO, Thunderbird 6, and Journey to the Far Side of the Sun (a.k.a. Doppelgänger).

Starting out in the model shop, Mike eventually became Special Effects director Derek Meddings' assistant in designing the fabulous futuristic vehicles, buildings, and look of the Andersons' imaginative series. Eventually, he would take on the bulk of design work for the series as Meddings became more involved in feature films. Contributing a single (unused) vehicle design and model to Space: 1999, Trim then moved into freelance illustration, creating an iconic cover painting for one of the best selling albums of all time; Jeff Wayne's Musical Version of The War of the Worlds'', in 1978.

References

External links

British film designers
British illustrators
Living people
Special effects people
1945 births